El Comercio is a daily newspaper in Spain.  Published in Gijón, it is the second-largest newspaper by circulation in Asturias, with a daily circulation of 24,000.

History and profile
El Comercio was first published on 2 September 1878. Since 1995 the paper has been part of Grupo Vocento. In 1996 it acquired La Voz de Avilés, and it continues that name for its Avilés edition.

In 2006 El Comercio had a circulation of 27,843 copies.

See also
 List of newspapers in Spain

References

External links
 El Comercio official website  
 El Comercio digital hemerotec 

1878 establishments in Spain
Grupo Vocento
Mass media in Gijón
Daily newspapers published in Spain
Publications established in 1878
Spanish-language newspapers